Masc may refer to:

Masc (band), a South Korean boy band
'masculine', as an abbreviation used in the context of grammatical gender

See also
Masculine (disambiguation)
Masculinity